Venirauto Industrias C.A.  is a Venezuelan automobile manufacturing company.

History 
Venirauto was founded on November 3, 2006, in Maracay. It is related to Iran Khodro and SAIPA from Iran. The production of automobiles started in 2007. The brand name is Venirauto. At the beginning of 2012, 470 people were employed.

Vehicles 
As of November 2016, the lineup consisted of the passenger car models Turpial and Centauro. Both were already introduced in 2007.

The wheelbase of the Turpial is 2345 mm, the length is 3935 mm and the height is 1455 mm.

The vehicle is 4935 mm long and 1460 mm high. The curb weight is given as 1285 kg.

Production figures 
On June 20, 2015, the then President Francisco Espinoza celebrated the completion 20,000 vehicles.

References

External links 

Car manufacturers of Venezuela
Government-owned companies of Venezuela
Vehicle manufacturing companies established in 2006
2006 establishments in Venezuela
Iran–Venezuela relations
Venezuelan brands